The 1969–70 season was Cardiff City F.C.'s 43rd season in the Football League. They competed in the 22-team Division Two, then the second tier of English football, finishing seventh.

The season saw also saw them win the Welsh Cup, beating Chester City in the final, although they enjoyed little success in other tournaments, being knocked out of both the FA Cup and League Cup in their first matches.

Players

League standings

Results by round

Fixtures and results

Second Division

League Cup

FA Cup

European Cup Winners Cup

Welsh Cup

Source

See also
Cardiff City F.C. seasons

Notes

References

Bibliography

Welsh Football Data Archive

Cardiff City F.C. seasons
Association football clubs 1969–70 season
Card